ZHU Miaolong (Traditional Chinese: 竺苗龍, Simplified Chinese: 竺苗龙; born April 1942) is a Chinese mathematician, educator and expert in space technology. He is the former President and current Honorary President of the Qingdao University.

Biography
Zhu was born in Fenghua, Ningbo City, Zhejiang Province. 1966, he graduated from the Department of Mathematics, Zhejiang University. July 1978, he became a lecturer at Northwest Industrial University. 1979, he was promoted into associate professor. He was transferred into the University of Science and Technology of China, and became a professor there. Then he went to Qingdao University in Qingdao, Shandong Province, and became the Vice-president of the university. 1993, he became the President and a dean of the Qingdao University. He has been the Honorary President of Qingdao University since 1997.

Works
Zhu made some contributions to the Chinese space program, especially in the fields of multiple-staged rockets and the optimal orbits for artificial satellites. 
 Some Theoretical Problems of the Spaceflight Mechanics (《航天力学中的一些理论问题》, both Chinese and English versions) 
 Introduction to the Optimal Orbit (《最佳轨道引论》)
 Optimization for the Multiple-Staged Rocket (《多级火箭的优化理论》)
 Several Problems of Space Flight (《星际飞行中的几个问题》)

References

Writers from Ningbo
20th-century Chinese mathematicians
21st-century Chinese mathematicians
Zhejiang University alumni
1942 births
Living people
Academic staff of Qingdao University
Educators from Ningbo
People's Republic of China science writers